Mack C. Alston Jr. (April 27, 1947 – December 24, 2014) was a professional American football player. A 6'2",  tight end from the  University of Maryland Eastern Shore, Alston played 11 seasons from 1970–1980 in the National Football League. Alston was enlisted in the D.C. National Guard, where he served in the Military Police battalion. He died in December 2014.

References

1947 births
2014 deaths
American football tight ends
Maryland Eastern Shore Hawks football players
Washington Redskins players
Houston Oilers players
Baltimore Colts players
Players of American football from South Carolina